Non c'è più religione is a 2016 Italian comedy film directed by Luca Miniero.

Cast
Claudio Bisio as Cecco
Alessandro Gassmann as Bilal
Angela Finocchiaro as Sister Marta
Nabiha Akkari as Haida
Mehdi Meskar as Alì
Laura Adriani as Maddalena
Giovanni Cacioppo as Aldo
Massimo De Lorenzo as Don Mario
Giovanni Esposito as the Bishop's secretary
Roberto Herlitzka as the Bishop
Paola Casella as Addolorata
Nunzia Schiano as Bilal's mother
Mounir Echchaoui as Ahmed
Grazia Daddario as Gilda

References

External links

2016 films
Films directed by Luca Miniero
2010s Italian-language films
2016 comedy films
Italian comedy films
2010s Italian films